Vishal Krishna Reddy (born 29 August 1977), also known as Vishal, is an Indian actor and film producer from Tamil films. The younger son of film producer G. K. Reddy, Vishal studied Visual Communications at Loyola College, Chennai. Best known for his roles in action films, he produces films under his production company, Vishal Film Factory.

Vishal made an entrance into the film industry as an assistant director for Arjun. He then became an actor and played his first lead role in the romantic thriller Chellamae (2004), before acting in the action films Sandakozhi, Thimiru, Thaamirabharani and Malaikottai. Vishal chose to create his own production studio and has since produced and worked on Pandiya Naadu (2013), Naan Sigappu Manithan (2014) and Poojai (2014).

Vishal was elected as the General Secretary of the Nadigar Sangam in October 2015 after initiating a movement against the previous committee. He was expelled from Tamil Film Producers' Council (TFPC) for remarks against the council. Later in April 2017, he won the election as President of Tamil Film Producers Council.

Early life and education
Vishal Krishna Reddy was born on 29 August 1977 into a Telugu family in Chennai, Tamil Nadu. His father GK Reddy is a businessman and a film producer for Telugu and Tamil films. His elder brother Vikram Krishna is also an actor and producer who has produced several of Vishal's films. 

Vishal did his schooling at Don Bosco Matriculation Higher Secondary School, Chennai. He was then graduated in visual communications from the Loyola College, Chennai.

Acting career

2004–2011 
Vishal assisted actor-director Arjun Sarja in his venture Vedham (2001), and a producer spotted Vishal on the sets of the film and signed him to appear in an acting role in Gandhi Krishna's Chellamae (2004). Accepting the role, Vishal prepared by joining Koothu-P-Pattarai to hone his acting skills and played the protagonist role of Raghunandan, whose wife is kidnapped by her childhood friend. A critic described his performance is "apt" but "there was plenty left to hone". His next film was Sandakozhi (2005) with N. Linguswamy, who had previously worked with his father's production house as an assistant director. Vishal was described to have "improved from his Chellamae days" and "clicked as an action hero". Film journalists stated that he was "the fastest rising action hero" of the time. After a cameo as himself in Sasi's Dishyum (2006), he went on to appear in Tarun Gopi's action film Thimiru (2006). The film opened to mixed reviews with Vishal being praised for his intense performance with a critic calling his performance "the film's only strength and, to an extent, making up for the weak script and poor characterisation". The film became Vishal's third consecutive commercial success, and he began to emerge in Tamil films.

His next film, the political action drama Sivappathigaram (2006), directed by Karu Pazhaniappan was a failure financially despite favourable reviews. His next film was released in January 2007, Hari's multi-starring family action drama Thaamirabharani (2007) and the film went on to gain considerable box office success, carrying good reports amidst other big budget releases. Later in the year, he appeared in Boopathy Pandian's Malaikottai (2007), a comedy entertainer. In his first full-length comic role, Vishal received mixed feedback for his portrayal from critics, with Rediff stating that he is "a far cry from the rather endearing young man in Sandakozhi", whilst describing his performance as "cringe-able". Behindwoods stated it as an "Average masala-mix entertainer". The film took a large opening and was declared a blockbuster, featuring in the top 10 at behindwoods box office. In the year 2008, for the first time, Vishal portrayed a police officer in Sathyam, which became a commercial failure at the box office. Then both his films Thoranai (2009) and Theeradha Vilaiyattu Pillai (2010) were just average grossers. Additionally, the box-office duds, Sathyam and Thoranai, both of which were bilingual in Tamil and Telugu, failed to establish his popularity in Telugu cinema.

Vishal was then given the opportunity to feature in Bala's dark comedy Avan Ivan (2011), after being recommended to the director by his friend Arya. Portraying a village stage actor with a squint, Vishal had severe eye pain and headaches, and he also had a serious muscular injury on sets. The film opened to mixed reviews, though Vishal's performance won positive reviews. Indiaglitz stated that Vishal delivered an "award winning performance" and that his "mannerisms and body language give you goosebumps". The reviewer further cited that "Vishal's spontaneous response to his mentor's death in the movie is touching. His demonstration of Navarasas in front of actor Suriya will melt you in tears". Vishal played the role of a police officer in his following release Vedi (2011), directed by Prabhu Deva, which was declared an instant flop at the box office.

2013–present 
In the 2013 film Samar, Vishal played a forest trek guide. Behindwoods stated that he "rocks in the action sequences". Following a cameo role in Theeya Velai Seiyyanum Kumaru, he starred in the action films Pattathu Yaanai and Pandiya Naadu. The latter was Vishal's debut production venture, while the former was the film debut of Aishwarya Arjun, the daughter of Arjun Sarja. Vishal opted to produce and collaborate with Thiru for a third venture Naan Sigappu Manithan (2014), a revenge drama, in which his character had narcolepsy. To prepare for the lead role, Vishal read up and studied real life case studies of people with the disorder, citing that there were no references from cinema which he could watch and learn. Then he had acted under director Hari for the second time in Poojai (2014), which did somewhat good business at the box office. In 2015, he acted two films, namely, Aambala and Paayum Puli.

In 2016, he appeared in three movies; Kathakali, Marudhu and Kaththi Sandai. The first two were average grossers, while Kaththi Sandai became a flop at the box office. In January 2017, Vishal signed his debut Malayalam film, as the main antagonist in the Mohanlal-starrer Villain, directed by B. Unnikrishnan. In September 2017, Vishal played a detective in Thupparivaalan directed by Mysskin which was loosely based on the British writer Arthur Conan Doyle's detective character, Sherlock Holmes. The film was a commercial success and was appreciated by audiences and critics. In 2018, Vishal had two major releases. The first one was Irumbu Thirai directed by newcomer P. S. Mithran which released in May 2018. And second was Sandakozhi 2 released in October 2018 was written and directed by N. Linguswamy. A sequel to the successful Sandakozhi (2005), the film stars Vishal in his 25th film. The film turned out to be an average grosser. In 2019, he did one movie titled Action directed by Sundar C. The film received mixed reviews and was a box office failure. In 2021, he acted in the action thriller Chakra directed my newcomer M.S Anandan. The film which released on 19 February, received mixed reviews from critics and audience.

Tamil Film Producers Council (2017–present) 
He was elected as President of Tamil Film Producers Council election, which was held on 2 April 2017. Apart from this, Vishal is also a staunch advocate against online piracy since 2014, having started an anti-piracy cell.

Television 
He made his television début in October 2018 as a host of Sun Naam Oruvar, a talk show airing on Sun TV.

Politics 
Vishal filed his nomination as an independent candidate for the by-poll to Radhakrishnan Nagar constituency in Chennai, which fell vacant following Jayalalithaa's death in December 2017. But his nomination was rejected.

Legal issues 
Vishal was arrested by police in December 2018 when he tried to enter inside the Tamil Film Producers Council in T Nagar, Chennai by forcefully trying to break the lock. The council was locked by 300 film producers alleging that Vishal failed to fulfil his promises during the elections in 2015.

Playback singing 
Vishal made his debut as a  playback singer in Madha Gaja Raja, an unreleased film directed by Sundar C, crapping up for the song My Dear Loveru.

Filmography

Film 

All films are in Tamil, unless otherwise noted.

Television

Notes

References

External links 

 
 
 

Living people
Male actors in Telugu cinema
Male actors in Tamil cinema
Male actors from Visakhapatnam
Indian male film actors
People from Visakhapatnam district
Male actors from Andhra Pradesh
Don Bosco schools alumni
Loyola College, Chennai alumni
21st-century Indian male actors
1977 births
Film producers from Andhra Pradesh
Telugu male actors
Male actors in Malayalam cinema